Prosopocera francoisiana is a species of beetle in the family Cerambycidae. It was described by Lepesme in 1948.

References

Prosopocerini
Beetles described in 1948